Above is the only studio album by the American rock band Mad Season, released on March 14, 1995, through Columbia Records. Above peaked at No. 24 on the Billboard 200 chart. The album has been certified gold by the RIAA in the United States. Layne Staley created the artwork on the album cover and inside the inlay.

Background
During the production of Pearl Jam's Vitalogy, guitarist Mike McCready went into rehabilitation in Minneapolis, Minnesota, where he met John Baker Saunders, who would a short while later become bassist in The Walkabouts. In 1994, when the two returned to Seattle, they formed a side band with Screaming Trees drummer Barrett Martin. Immediately the trio set up rehearsal time together and began writing material. McCready then brought in friend and Alice in Chains frontman Layne Staley to round out the line-up. McCready had hoped that being around sober musicians would push Staley to get himself sober.

Recording
The album was recorded in 1994 at Bad Animals Studio in Seattle, Washington. The band worked with producer Brett Eliason, who had previously worked with McCready as Pearl Jam's sound engineer. The album was mixed by Eliason.

The music for the songs "Wake Up" and "River of Deceit" came out of rehearsals that the group had before Staley joined. The song "Artificial Red" came together at a show that the band had at the Crocodile Cafe in October 1994. The songs "Lifeless Dead" and "I Don't Know Anything" were first premiered on Pearl Jam's January 8, 1995 Self-Pollution satellite radio broadcast, a four-and-a-half-hour-long pirate broadcast out of Seattle which was available to any radio stations that wanted to carry it. McCready said, "We did all the Mad Season music in about seven days. It took Layne just a few more days to finish his vocals, which was intense since we only rehearsed twice and did four shows. So this has been the most spontaneous thing I've ever been involved in. This was done even quicker than Temple of the Dog which took about four weeks... With Mad Season we just went in and started jamming on tunes and everybody had ideas and it just happened with three or four days."

McCready said, "I told [Staley]... 'You do what you want, you write all the songs and lyrics. You're the singer.' He'd come in, and he'd do these beautiful songs." During the making of the album, Staley read The Prophet by Kahlil Gibran. Martin said, "Layne Staley felt as though he was on a spiritual mission through his music. Not a rock mission, a spiritual mission."

Music and lyrics

McCready described the songs on the album as "some jazzy stuff, some blues, some arena rock." Stephen Thomas Erlewine of AllMusic said that the album "sounds like a cross between Alice in Chains and Pearl Jam, taking the ponderous seriousness of Alice and PJ's '90s update of winding '70s guitar rock." "I Don't Know Anything"'s verse bar features a droning, overdriven guitar melody centered on the use of harmonics. "Long Gone Day" takes influence from genres as diverse as jazz, progressive rock, classic rock, and blues. Saxophonist Skerik contributes to the song.

Staley is credited for writing all the lyrics on the original release within the liner notes of the 2013 deluxe issue. As was the case with much of his work with Alice in Chains, Staley's lyrics dealt with his struggle against addiction as well as other personal troubles. Lyrically, much of "River of Deceit" was inspired by Khalil Gibran's The Prophet. Vocalist Mark Lanegan of Screaming Trees contributes guest vocals on "I'm Above" and "Long Gone Day"; he is also credited for co-writing the music to those tracks along with McCready and Martin. Lanegan also wrote the lyrics for the three bonus tracks on disc 1 of the deluxe issue - "Locomotive", "Black Book of Fear", and "Slip Away". R.E.M. guitarist Peter Buck is credited for co-writing the music to "Black Book of Fear" along with McCready, Martin, Saunders, and Lanegan.

Release and reception

Above received mostly positive reviews from music critics and was very well received by grunge fans, but some critics pointed out the album's flaws. Despite some negative criticism, the album was a moderate commercial success. Over the course of 1995, Above scaled the Billboard 200 album chart eventually peaking at number 24. Above has been certified gold by the RIAA.

Melody Maker called the album "a Country Sabbath combination" and "a refreshing holiday from the pressures of corporate ultra-stardom." AllMusic staff writer Stephen Thomas Erlewine gave the album three out of five stars, saying that "the album meanders without much direction, yet there are flashes of invention, particularly in Staley's work, with McCready contributing a few tasty licks." Rolling Stone staff writer Barbara Davies gave Above two and a half out of five stars but was later changed to a more positive three out of five stars, saying that Mad Season "take artistic risks and set out to make something fresh on Above." However, she criticized the album for having a "hit-or-miss quality." Davies ended the review by stating that "the band is—at times—more than the mere sum of its parts." Chuck Eddy of Entertainment Weekly gave the album a C. He said, "A sax solo and zooming guitars provide momentary relief, but most Mad Season sludge is unbearably immobile." He ended by saying, "It's big trouble when one of the most upbeat songs is called 'Lifeless Dead'."

Above included the singles "River of Deceit", "I Don't Know Anything", and "Long Gone Day". The lead single "River of Deceit" had an accompanying music video, while other music videos were taken from performances from the band's home video release, Live at The Moore. "River of Deceit" was the most successful song from Above on the rock charts, reaching number two on the Mainstream Rock charts and number nine on the Modern Rock charts. "I Don't Know Anything" also charted on the Mainstream Rock charts. "River of Deceit" is arguably the group's best known song while "I Don't Know Anything" still maintains modest radio play today.

Rerelease
In October 2012, drummer Barrett Martin announced a Mad Season box set would be released on March 12, 2013, nearly 18 years to the day after the release of Above. The release date was later pushed back to April 2, 2013. Martin said that

On January 7, 2013, Blabbermouth.net reported that Legacy Recordings would release an expanded deluxe edition of Above, a three-disc boxset comprising two CDs and one DVD. It includes the original studio album and a host of extras, specifically some unreleased tracks from the band's unfinished second album with lyrics and vocals by Mark Lanegan; the full audio set of the band's "Live at The Moore" performance on April 29, 1995; and the first official DVD release of "Live at The Moore", including a previously unreleased full concert video of the band's New Year's Eve performance from the now-defunct Seattle club RKCNDY.

In April 2019, Above was ranked No. 18 on Rolling Stone's "50 Greatest Grunge Albums" list.

Packaging
The album's gloomy, black and white cover art featuring a couple tongue-kissing was illustrated by Staley. The drawing was based upon a photograph of Staley and his ex-fiancée, Demri Lara Parrott. The album's title comes from the song "I'm Above".

Track listing
All lyrics by Layne Staley, except where noted. All music by Mad Season, except where noted.

DVD: Live at The Moore plus bonus footage
Full video set of the Live at The Moore performance from Seattle, Washington, on April 29, 1995. It also contains bonus footage, including a full concert of the band's performance at RKCNDY in Seattle on December 31, 1994, and both performances from Pearl Jam's Self Pollution Radio broadcast on January 8, 1995.

Outtakes
A promotional version of Above has a bonus track entitled "Interlude", an instrumental piece by McCready which was also sometimes played live by Pearl Jam, labelled as "Going Home (improv)", which follows "Artificial Red". Mad Season's cover of the John Lennon song "I Don't Wanna Be a Soldier" was also recorded around this time. "I Don't Wanna Be a Soldier" appeared on the 1995 John Lennon tribute album, Working Class Hero.

Personnel

Mad Season
 Barrett Martin – drums, percussion, double bass, cello, marimba, vibraphone
 Mike McCready – rhythm, lead and acoustic guitars
 John Baker Saunders – bass guitar
 Layne Staley – vocals, rhythm guitar, illustrations

Additional musicians
 Mark Lanegan – vocals on "I'm Above", "Long Gone Day", "Locomotive", "Black Book of Fear" and "Slip Away"
 Skerik (Nalgas Sin Carne) – saxophone on "Long Gone Day" and "I Don't Wanna Be a Soldier"

Production
 Brett Eliason – production, engineering, mixing
 Sony Felho – engineering
 Sam Hofstedt – assistant engineering
 Mad Season – production, art direction
 Lance Mercer – photography
 Gabrielle Raumberger – design
 Howie Weinberg – mastering

Charts

Weekly charts

Year-end charts

Certifications

References

1995 debut albums
Columbia Records albums
Mad Season (band) albums
Albums produced by Mike McCready